Albert Stone is the owner of Sterilite and a philanthropist from Townsend, Massachusetts.

Early life
Albert Stone was raised in Haverhill, Massachusetts. He attended Colby College and then served in the navy during the Korean War. During that time, he was stationed in Okinawa. After his service in the military, he attended Harvard Business School. After his graduation, he joined Sterilite, the company that his uncle and father founded in 1939.

Later life
After moving the company from Fitchburg, Massachusetts to Townsend, Massachusetts in 1968, he settled down in neighboring town Groton. Later on in life, he became a philanthropist locally. Over the years, he has donated money for a food bank, playground, and defibrillators to the town. His most recent donation has been estimated at 20 million dollars, when he donated money for the construction of the town library and senior center. This donation came along with a clause that stated that the library should not be named after him or the company, but for a former selectman and his wife, consistent with his rather quiet demeanor and attention-shy personality.

In 1969, Mr. Stone became a member of the Board of Trustees of Applewild School, an independent co-ed day school located in Fitchburg, Massachusetts.  Mr. Stone held the position of president of the board from 1973 to 1982.  In 2007, Applewild School presented its Founder's Award to Mr. Stone.

References

External links
http://www.boston.com/news/local/massachusetts/articles/2009/11/13/a_grand_gift_to_the_town_from_the_man_you_cant_see/

American philanthropists
People from Framingham, Massachusetts
Living people
1928 births
Colby College alumni
Harvard Business School alumni
People from Townsend, Massachusetts